Radio broadcasting is the broadcasting of audio (sound), sometimes with related metadata, by radio waves to radio receivers belonging to a public audience.  In terrestrial radio broadcasting the radio waves are broadcast by a land-based radio station, while in satellite radio the radio waves are broadcast by a satellite in Earth orbit.  To receive the content the listener must have a broadcast radio receiver (radio).  Stations are often affiliated with a radio network that provides content in a common radio format, either in broadcast syndication or simulcast, or both.  Radio stations broadcast with several different types of modulation:  AM radio stations transmit in AM (amplitude modulation), FM radio stations transmit in FM (frequency modulation), which are older analog audio standards, while newer digital radio stations transmit in several digital audio standards: DAB (digital audio broadcasting), HD radio, DRM (Digital Radio Mondiale).  Television broadcasting is a separate service that also uses radio frequencies to broadcast television (video) signals.

History

The earliest radio stations were radiotelegraphy systems and did not carry audio. For audio broadcasts to be possible, electronic detection and amplification devices had to be incorporated.

The thermionic valve (a kind of vacuum tube) was invented in 1904 by the English physicist John Ambrose Fleming. He developed a device he called an "oscillation valve" (because it passes current in only one direction). The heated filament, or cathode, was capable of thermionic emission of electrons that would flow to the plate (or anode) when it was at a higher voltage. Electrons, however, could not pass in the reverse direction because the plate was not heated and thus not capable of thermionic emission of electrons. Later known as the Fleming valve, it could be used as a rectifier of alternating current and as a radio wave detector. This greatly improved the crystal set which rectified the radio signal using an early solid-state diode based on a crystal and a so-called cat's whisker. However, what was still required was an amplifier.

The triode (mercury-vapor filled with a control grid) was created on March 4, 1906, by the Austrian Robert von Lieben independent from that, on October 25, 1906, Lee De Forest patented his three-element Audion. It wasn't put to practical use until 1912 when its amplifying ability became recognized by researchers.

By about 1920, valve technology had matured to the point where radio broadcasting was quickly becoming viable. However, an early audio transmission that could be termed a broadcast may have occurred on Christmas Eve in 1906 by Reginald Fessenden, although this is disputed. While many early experimenters attempted to create systems similar to radiotelephone devices by which only two parties were meant to communicate, there were others who intended to transmit to larger audiences. Charles Herrold started broadcasting in California in 1909 and was carrying audio by the next year. (Herrold's station eventually became KCBS).

In The Hague, the Netherlands, PCGG started broadcasting on November 6, 1919, making it, arguably the first commercial broadcasting station. In 1916, Frank Conrad, an electrical engineer employed at the Westinghouse Electric Corporation, began broadcasting from his Wilkinsburg, Pennsylvania garage with the call letters 8XK. Later, the station was moved to the top of the Westinghouse factory building in East Pittsburgh, Pennsylvania. Westinghouse relaunched the station as KDKA on November 2, 1920, as the first commercially licensed radio station in the United States. The commercial broadcasting designation came from the type of broadcast license; advertisements did not air until years later. The first licensed broadcast in the United States came from KDKA itself: the results of the Harding/Cox Presidential Election. The Montreal station that became CFCF began broadcast programming on May 20, 1920, and the Detroit station that became WWJ began program broadcasts beginning on August 20, 1920, although neither held a license at the time.

In 1920, wireless broadcasts for entertainment began in the UK from the Marconi Research Centre 2MT at Writtle near Chelmsford, England. A famous broadcast from Marconi's New Street Works factory in Chelmsford was made by the famous soprano Dame Nellie Melba on June 15, 1920, where she sang two arias and her famous trill. She was the first artist of international renown to participate in direct radio broadcasts. The 2MT station began to broadcast regular entertainment in 1922. The BBC was amalgamated in 1922 and received a Royal Charter in 1926, making it the first national broadcaster in the world, followed by Czech Radio and other European broadcasters in 1923.

Radio Argentina began regularly scheduled transmissions from the Teatro Coliseo in Buenos Aires on August 27, 1920, making its own priority claim. The station got its license on November 19, 1923. The delay was due to the lack of official Argentine licensing procedures before that date. This station continued regular broadcasting of entertainment and cultural fare for several decades.

Radio in education soon followed and colleges across the U.S. began adding radio broadcasting courses to their curricula. Curry College in Milton, Massachusetts introduced one of the first broadcasting majors in 1932 when the college teamed up with WLOE in Boston to have students broadcast programs. By 1931, a majority of U.S. households owned at least one radio receiver.

In line to ITU Radio Regulations (article1.61) each broadcasting station shall be classified by the service in which it operates permanently or temporarily.

Types

Broadcasting by radio takes several forms. These include AM and FM stations. There are several subtypes, namely commercial broadcasting, non-commercial educational (NCE) public broadcasting and non-profit varieties as well as community radio, student-run campus radio stations, and hospital radio stations can be found throughout the world. Many stations broadcast on shortwave bands using AM technology that can be received over thousands of miles (especially at night). For example, the BBC, VOA, VOR, and Deutsche Welle have transmitted via shortwave to Africa and Asia. These broadcasts are very sensitive to atmospheric conditions and solar activity.

Nielsen Audio, formerly known as Arbitron, the United States-based company that reports on radio audiences, defines a "radio station" as a government-licensed AM or FM station; an HD Radio (primary or multicast) station; an internet stream of an existing government-licensed station; one of the satellite radio channels from XM Satellite Radio or Sirius Satellite Radio; or, potentially, a station that is not government licensed.

AM

AM stations were the earliest broadcasting stations to be developed. AM refers to amplitude modulation, a mode of broadcasting radio waves by varying the amplitude of the carrier signal in response to the amplitude of the signal to be transmitted. The medium-wave band is used worldwide for AM broadcasting. Europe also uses the long wave band. In response to the growing popularity of FM stereo radio stations in the late 1980s and early 1990s, some North American stations began broadcasting in AM stereo, though this never gained popularity, and very few receivers were ever sold.

The signal is subject to interference from electrical storms (lightning) and other electromagnetic interference (EMI). One advantage of AM radio signal is that it can be detected (turned into sound) with simple equipment. If a signal is strong enough, not even a power source is needed; building an unpowered crystal radio receiver was a common childhood project in the early decades of AM broadcasting.

AM broadcasts occur on North American airwaves in the medium wave frequency range of 525 to 1,705 kHz (known as the “standard broadcast band”). The band was expanded in the 1990s by adding nine channels from 1,605 to 1,705 kHz. Channels are spaced every 10 kHz in the Americas, and generally every 9 kHz everywhere else.

AM transmissions cannot be ionospherically propagated during the day due to strong absorption in the D-layer of the ionosphere. In a crowded channel environment, this means that the power of regional channels which share a frequency must be reduced at night or directionally beamed in order to avoid interference, which reduces the potential nighttime audience. Some stations have frequencies unshared with other stations in North America; these are called clear-channel stations. Many of them can be heard across much of the country at night. During the night, absorption largely disappears and permits signals to travel to much more distant locations via ionospheric reflections. However, fading of the signal can be severe at night.

AM radio transmitters can transmit audio frequencies up to 15 kHz (now limited to 10 kHz in the US due to FCC rules designed to reduce interference), but most receivers are only capable of reproducing frequencies up to 5 kHz or less. At the time that AM broadcasting began in the 1920s, this provided adequate fidelity for existing microphones, 78 rpm recordings, and loudspeakers. The fidelity of sound equipment subsequently improved considerably, but the receivers did not. Reducing the bandwidth of the receivers reduces the cost of manufacturing and makes them less prone to interference. AM stations are never assigned adjacent channels in the same service area. This prevents the sideband power generated by two stations from interfering with each other. Bob Carver created an AM stereo tuner employing notch filtering that demonstrated that an AM broadcast can meet or exceed the 15 kHz baseband bandwidth allotted to FM stations without objectionable interference. After several years, the tuner was discontinued. Bob Carver had left the company and the Carver Corporation later cut the number of models produced before discontinuing production completely.

As well as on the medium wave bands, amplitude modulation (AM) is also used on the shortwave and long wave bands.  Shortwave is used largely for national broadcasters, international propaganda, or religious broadcasting organizations. Shortwave transmissions can have international or inter-continental range depending on atmospheric conditions.  Long-wave AM broadcasting occurs in Europe, Asia, and Africa. The ground wave propagation at these frequencies is little affected by daily changes in the ionosphere, so broadcasters need not reduce power at night to avoid interference with other transmitters.

FM

FM refers to frequency modulation, and occurs on VHF airwaves in the frequency range of 88 to 108 MHz everywhere except Japan and Russia. Russia, like the former Soviet Union, uses 65.9 to 74 MHz frequencies in addition to the world standard. Japan uses the 76 to 90 MHz frequency band.

Edwin Howard Armstrong invented wide-band FM radio in the early 1930s to overcome the problem of radio-frequency interference (RFI), which plagued AM radio reception. At the same time, greater fidelity was made possible by spacing stations further apart in the radio frequency spectrum. Instead of 10 kHz apart, as on the AM band in the US, FM channels are 200 kHz (0.2 MHz) apart. In other countries, greater spacing is sometimes mandatory, such as in New Zealand, which uses 700 kHz spacing (previously 800 kHz). The improved fidelity made available was far in advance of the audio equipment of the 1940s, but wide interchannel spacing was chosen to take advantage of the noise-suppressing feature of wideband FM.

Bandwidth of 200 kHz is not needed to accommodate an audio signal — 20 kHz to 30 kHz is all that is necessary for a narrowband FM signal. The 200 kHz bandwidth allowed room for ±75 kHz signal deviation from the assigned frequency, plus guard bands to reduce or eliminate adjacent channel interference. The larger bandwidth allows for broadcasting a 15 kHz bandwidth audio signal plus a 38 kHz stereo "subcarrier"—a piggyback signal that rides on the main signal. Additional unused capacity is used by some broadcasters to transmit utility functions such as background music for public areas, GPS auxiliary signals, or financial market data.

The AM radio problem of interference at night was addressed in a different way. At the time FM was set up, the available frequencies were far higher in the spectrum than those used for AM radio - by a factor of approximately 100. Using these frequencies meant that even at far higher power, the range of a given FM signal was much shorter; thus its market was more local than for AM radio. The reception range at night is the same as in the daytime. All FM broadcast transmissions are line-of-sight, and ionospheric bounce is not viable. The much larger bandwidths, compared to AM and SSB, are more susceptible to phase dispersion. Propagation speeds (celerities) are fastest in the ionosphere at the lowest sideband frequency. The celerity difference between the highest and lowest sidebands is quite apparent to the listener. Such distortion occurs up to frequencies of approximately 50 MHz. Higher frequencies do not reflect from the ionosphere, nor from storm clouds. Moon reflections have been used in some experiments, but require impractical power levels.

The original FM radio service in the U.S. was the Yankee Network, located in New England. Regular FM broadcasting began in 1939 but did not pose a significant threat to the AM broadcasting industry. It required purchase of a special receiver. The frequencies used, 42 to 50 MHz, were not those used today. The change to the current frequencies, 88 to 108 MHz, began after the end of World War II and was to some extent imposed by AM broadcasters as an attempt to cripple what was by now realized to be a potentially serious threat.

FM radio on the new band had to begin from the ground floor. As a commercial venture, it remained a little-used audio enthusiasts' medium until the 1960s. The more prosperous AM stations, or their owners, acquired FM licenses and often broadcast the same programming on the FM station as on the AM station ("simulcasting"). The FCC limited this practice in the 1960s. By the 1980s, since almost all new radios included both AM and FM tuners, FM became the dominant medium, especially in cities. Because of its greater range, AM remained more common in rural environments.

Pirate radio

Pirate radio is illegal or non-regulated radio transmission. It is most commonly used to describe illegal broadcasting for entertainment or political purposes. Sometimes it is used for illegal two-way radio operation. Its history can be traced back to the unlicensed nature of the transmission, but historically there has been occasional use of sea vessels—fitting the most common perception of a pirate—as broadcasting bases.
Rules and regulations vary largely from country to country, but often the term pirate radio describes the unlicensed broadcast of FM radio, AM radio, or shortwave signals over a wide range. In some places, radio stations are legal where the signal is transmitted, but illegal where the signals are received—especially when the signals cross a national boundary. In other cases, a broadcast may be considered "pirate" due to the type of content, its transmission format, or the transmitting power (wattage) of the station, even if the transmission is not technically illegal (such as a webcast or an amateur radio transmission). Pirate radio stations are sometimes referred to as bootleg radio or clandestine stations.

Terrestrial digital radio

Digital radio broadcasting has emerged, first in Europe (the UK in 1995 and Germany in 1999), and later in the United States, France, the Netherlands, South Africa, and many other countries worldwide. The simplest system is named DAB Digital Radio, for Digital Audio Broadcasting, and uses the public domain EUREKA 147 (Band III) system. DAB is used mainly in the UK and South Africa. Germany and the Netherlands use the DAB and DAB+ systems, and France uses the L-Band system of DAB Digital Radio.

The broadcasting regulators of the United States and Canada have chosen to use HD radio, an in-band on-channel system that puts digital broadcasts at frequencies adjacent to the analog broadcast. HD Radio is owned by a consortium of private companies that is called iBiquity. An international non-profit consortium Digital Radio Mondiale (DRM), has introduced the public domain DRM system, which is used by a relatively small number of broadcasters worldwide.

International broadcasting

Broadcasters in one country have several reasons to reach out to an audience in other countries. Commercial broadcasters may simply see a business opportunity to sell advertising or subscriptions to a broader audience. This is more efficient than broadcasting to a single country, because domestic entertainment programs and information gathered by domestic news staff can be cheaply repackaged for non-domestic audiences.

Governments typically have different motivations for funding international broadcasting. One clear reason is for ideological, or propaganda reasons. Many government-owned stations portray their nation in a positive, non-threatening way. This could be to encourage business investment in or tourism to the nation. Another reason is to combat a negative image produced by other nations or internal dissidents, or insurgents. Radio RSA, the broadcasting arm of the apartheid South African government, is an example of this. A third reason is to promote the ideology of the broadcaster. For example, a program on Radio Moscow from the 1960s to the 1980s was What is Communism?

A second reason is to advance a nation's foreign policy interests and agenda by disseminating its views on international affairs or on the events in particular parts of the world. During the Cold War the American Radio Free Europe and Radio Liberty and Indian Radio AIR were founded to broadcast news from "behind the Iron Curtain" that was otherwise being censored and promote dissent and occasionally, to disseminate disinformation. Currently, the US operates similar services aimed at Cuba (Radio y Televisión Martí) and the People's Republic of China, Vietnam, Laos  and North Korea (Radio Free Asia).

Besides ideological reasons, many stations are run by religious broadcasters and are used to provide religious education, religious music, or worship service programs. For example, Vatican Radio, established in 1931, broadcasts such programs. Another station, such as HCJB or Trans World Radio will carry brokered programming from evangelists. In the case of the Broadcasting Services of the Kingdom of Saudi Arabia, both governmental and religious programming is provided.

Extensions
Extensions of traditional radio-wave broadcasting for audio broadcasting in general include cable radio, local wire television networks, DTV radio, satellite radio, and Internet radio via streaming media on the Internet.

Satellite

The enormous entry costs of space-based satellite transmitters and restrictions on available radio spectrum licenses has restricted growth of Satellite radio broadcasts. In the US and Canada, just two services, XM Satellite Radio and Sirius Satellite Radio exist. Both XM and Sirius are owned by Sirius XM Satellite Radio, which was formed by the merger of XM and Sirius on July 29, 2008, whereas in Canada, XM Radio Canada and Sirius Canada remained separate companies until 2010. Worldspace in Africa and Asia, and MobaHO! in Japan and the ROK were two unsuccessful satellite radio operators which have gone out of business.

Program formats

Radio program formats differ by country, regulation, and markets. For instance, the U.S. Federal Communications Commission designates the 88–92 megahertz band in the U.S. for non-profit or educational programming, with advertising prohibited.

In addition, formats change in popularity as time passes and technology improves. Early radio equipment only allowed program material to be broadcast in real time, known as live broadcasting. As technology for sound recording improved, an increasing proportion of broadcast programming used pre-recorded material. A current trend is the automation of radio stations. Some stations now operate without direct human intervention by using entirely pre-recorded material sequenced by computer control.

See also

 Broadcasting construction permit
 Call sign
 Disc jockey (DJ)
 History of broadcasting
 International broadcasting
 List of radio topics
 Low power radio station
 Radio
 Radio antenna
 Radio network
 Radio personality
 RF modulation
 Sports commentator
 Television station

References

External links

Federal Communications Commission website  - fcc.gov
DXing.info  - Information about radio stations worldwide
Radio-Locator.com - Links to 13,000 radio stations worldwide
BBC reception advice 
DXradio.50webs.com  "The SWDXER" - with general SWL information and radio antenna tips
RadioStationZone.com  - 10.000+ radio stations worldwide with ratings, comments and listen live links
Online-Radio-Stations.org  - The Web Radio Tuner has a comprehensive list of over 50.000 radio stations
UnwantedEmissions.com  - A general reference to radio spectrum allocations
Radio stanice  - Search for radio stations throughout the Europe
Radio Emisoras Latinas  - has a directory with thousands of Latin America Radio Stations